The Canaan Motor Club (CMC) is a race track in Canaan, New Hampshire, in the United States. The CMC is a  technically challenging road course with extensive runoff areas to promote a safe environment for all track users. The track may be configured to run two separate events at the same time.

External links
Official website

Buildings and structures in Grafton County, New Hampshire
Canaan, New Hampshire
Motorsport venues in New Hampshire
Tourist attractions in Grafton County, New Hampshire